The seventh series of You Can Dance - Po prostu Tańcz! premiered on TVN on 7 March 2012. Augustin Egurolla, Michał Piróg and Kinga Rusin returned as judges and Patricia Kazadi presents the show again. The auditions began on 11 December 2011 in Kraków and ended on 12–13 January 2012 in Warsaw.

The winner of the show will receive a three-month scholarship at the International Dance Academy in Los Angeles, the place where many famous artists, including Lady Gaga, Justin Bieber, Rihanna and Britney Spears, train. The winner will also have their personal trainer, who will take care of dancer's abilities and launching career in the United States.  In previous years, the main prize was a scholarship at Broadway Dance Center in New York.

Auditions
The auditions were held in five Polish cities.  The first day was an open audition, when the producers chose auditionees, who would perform in front of the judges and live audience. The filmed audition with judges took place on the following day. Footage from these auditions was shown in the first five episodes.

Top 36 dancers
During the auditions judges picked 36 dancers. These dancers were taking part in a choreography camp in Santa Cruz.

This dancer was shown in a pre-season sneak peek.

These dancers were shown only in youcandance.tvn.pl website extras.

These dancers earned the tickets after the choreography round.

Returning dancers
This season there were some dancers returning from previous seasons.

Choreography Camp (Casablanca) week 
Judges: Agustin Egurolla, Kinga Rusin, Michał Piróg

Eliminations during Choreography Camp

Dancers were practising choreographies during first three days of the Camp. Then there were no cuts. Judges gave some dancers who didn't handle the choreographies well yellow cards; second yellow equals a red card. Some dancers received red cards immediately, before even getting a yellow card.
After rehearsals contestants performed in every style they practiced - then judges cut 12 dancers.
After these cuts the remaining contestants faced the Final Choreography round with Tina Landon.
Some dancers had to dance for their lives after the Final Choreography round.

Order of eliminations
Red Cards: Edyta Wajer
First elimination after 3 days: Artur Świrad, Radek "Shin Tao" Peciak, Natalia Andersz, Paweł Porwoł, Marek Hylak, Angelika Paradowska, Karolina Barańska, Magdalena Jakubowska, Jessica Ali
Cuts after dancing for life after the 1st elimination: Natalia Zduńska
Cuts after Final Choreography round: Gracja Górniak, Wojciech Koper, Kamil Ignaczuk, Barbara Węgorzewska, Oliwia Berkowska
Cuts after dancing for life after the Final Choreography round: Joanna Tuliszka, Paweł Hołderny, Michał Przybyła, Artur Golec

Top 14 contestants

Women

Men

Elimination chart

Note 1: Because of injury Martyna Andrzejczak had to leave the competition. She was replaced by the female dancer who was eliminated last week - Kinga Mucha. According to So You Think You Can Dance rules she will be allowed to come back next season.
Note 2: Because of injury Mateusz Sobecko had to leave the competition. He was replaced by the male dancer who was eliminated last week - Igor Leonik. According to So You Think You Can Dance rules he will be allowed to come back next season.

Performance nights

Week 1: Top 14 (25 April 2012)

Group Dance: Outta Your Mind — Lil Jon ft. LMFAO (Krump; Choreographer: Kwame "Big Wave" Osai)
Top 14 Couple dances:

Bottom 3 Couples solos:

Eliminated:
Sarah Kukliński
Sebastian Mazur

Week 2: Top 12 (2 May 2012)
Group Dance: Off To The Races — Lana Del Rey (Jazz; Choreographer: Geneviève Dorion-Coupal)
Top 12 Couple dances:

Bottom 3 Couples solos:

Eliminated:
Kinga Mucha
Jakub Frydrychewicz

Week 3: Top 10 (9 May 2012)
Group Dance: National Anthem — Lana Del Rey (Modern Underground; Choreographer: Thierry Verger)
Top 10 Couple dances:

Bottom 3 Couples solos:

Eliminated:
Karolina "Cuki" Dziemieszkiewicz
Igor Leonik

Week 4: Top 8 (16 May 2012)
Group Dances:

Top 8 Couple dances:

Bottom 3 Couples solos:

Eliminated:
Kinga Mucha
Stanisław Korotyński

Week 5: Top 6 (23 May 2012)
Group Dance:Body - Sean Paul(Hip-Hop/Dancehall; Choreographer: Joao Assuncao)
Couple dances:

Top 6's solos:

Eliminated:
Joanna Zwierzyńska
Bartosz Wilniewicz

Week 6: Top 4 (30 May 2012)
Group Dance: Put Your Graffiti On Me - Kat Graham (Jazz; Choreographer: Matthew Tseng)
Couple dances:

Top 4's solos:

Results:
Winner: Brian Poniatowski
Runner Up: Anna Matlewska

Week 7: Finale - Top 2 (6 June 2012)
Guest Dancer:
Patrizia Kazadi & Rafał "Roofi" Kamiński (season 1) - Troublemaker - Taio Cruz - Hip-Hop
Group dances:

Top 2 Couple dances:

Top 2 solos:

Results:
Winner: Brian Poniatowski
Runner Up: Anna Matlewska

All-stars
During the season finale all-stars danced with the finalists as the part of the competition. Every dancer was asked which dancer they want to dance with. And the dreams came true, because the top 2 were privileged to dance with their favourite You Can Dance - Po Prostu Tańcz! dancer.

Controversy

In his role as executive judge, Agustin Egurolla has overruled several of the majority decisions of the judges panel over the course of the season.  The first of these was a decision to give auditioner Sarah Kukliński a ticket to boot camp, despite opposition from both Kinga Rusin and Michał Piróg.  Later, in the Top 8 live show he made a unilateral decision to select Anna Matlewska and Igor Leonik as bottom (dance for your lives) dancers for that week, although the other two judges felt they should be safe.   He said he felt Matlewska had only had to prove herself in contemporary styles so far in the competition, mitigating the impressiveness of her performance to that date.

First for any So You Think You Can Dance series
 From this season every dancer has his/her own SMS number, and it won't be changed during the season.

First for You Can Dance - Po Prostu Tańcz!
 SMS cost has reduced from last season. Now it is 2.46 PLN per SMS; in previous seasons it was 3.69 PLN per SMS.
 The winner gets a 3-month scholarship to the International Dance Academy in Los Angeles.

Ratings

References

Season 07
2012 Polish television seasons